Reverend Doctor Salim Sahyouni (in Arabic سليم صهيوني) is a Protestant Evangelical Reverend Minister and presently the head of the National Evangelical Synod of Syria and Lebanon (in Arabic المجمع الأعلى للطائفة الانجيلية في لبنان وسوريا) that joins various Arab Evangelical church denominations in Lebanon, Syria and the Near East. Right Reverend Sahyouni was married to Hind Naim Abou Asaly who died in 2004. The Sahyounis had two children.

See also
Protestantism in Lebanon

References

Living people
Protestant ministers and clergy in Lebanon
Lebanese Protestants
Year of birth missing (living people)